A bamischijf  is a Dutch snack consisting of a slice (Dutch: schijf) of bami, breaded and deep-fried. It is a Dutch modification of a Chinese-Indonesian noodle dish bakmi goreng. Nasischijf is a similar dish made with nasi goreng.

Preparation
The filling is prepared using a base of cooked bami.  The ingredients are similar to those for bami goreng: vegetables and meat, with Indonesian spices and sauces. The noodles are packed as thick as possible so that the product's filling becomes dough-like in consistency.  This mass is formed into a sausage roll, from which slices are cut. These slices are breaded and fried.

Much of this snack's production takes place in factories, where the product is prepared and then frozen, before being shipped to snackbars.

Variations 
Other varieties of bamischijf are usually named after their shape: bamiblok (bami block), bamibal (bami ball) and bamihap (bami bite). Another variation is the nasischijf (nasi slice), which consists of nasi rather than bami.

See also

 Bakmi
 Indonesian cuisine

References

Snack foods
Dutch fusion cuisine
Indonesian Chinese cuisine